Philadelphia subway may refer to:
 SEPTA#Rapid transit
 Broad Street Line, otherwise known as the "Subway," colored orange
 Market–Frankford Line, otherwise known as the "El," colored blue
 SEPTA subway–surface trolley lines, colored green on maps
 PATCO Speedline, a non-SEPTA operated line colored red